Schäffler is a surname. Notable people with the surname include:
  (born 1941), Austrian priest and theologian
 Frank Schäffler (born 1968), German politician
 Manuel Schäffler (born 1989), German footballer